El General Paz & La Triple Frontera (GP3F) is a rock fusion band founded by Anel Paz, integrated by musicians from various countries (Argentina, Brazil, Cuba, México, Uruguay), that merges several rhythms in their songs, including Rock, Funk, Folklore of Latin America, Brazilian Music, Jazz, and World Music. The Afro-Latin Rhythms joined with a Rock-Funk sound, creates an original and unique proposal.

History
GP3F was formed in late 2007, founded by the Argentinean Anel Paz, renowned guitarist, singer, recording engineer, and producer.

The band is completed by Brazilian Kiki Ferreira, Uruguayan Jorge Platero, and Argentines Mayra Domine, Diego La Rosa, and Cesar La Rosa.

With this formation, in the following years, they toured several cities in Argentina playing in various shows and festivals.

In September 2008 they performed at the Pepsi Music Festival, in Buenos Aires.

In October 2008 they are opening act for Brazilian Gilberto Gil at Teatro Gran Rex.

Simultaneously, the band releases their first album "El General Paz & La Triple Frontera", edited by Popart Records / Sony Music, and also their first video and broadcast cut, "a Marte", directed by the Argentinian Picky Talarico and produced by Metropolis Films.

In 2009 GP3F makes a special one-hour live show at El Canal de la Música, and also produced and releases the video "Carnavalero" directed by the Argentinian Rodrigo Espina.The band also perform at Pepsi Music Festival 2009.

GP3F with Diemen Noord create and produce the Primer Festival Itinerante de World Music (first Traveling World Music Festival), in January 2010. Both bands tour the Patagonia Argentina with the support of the Ministries of Culture of Chubut, Neuquén, and Rio Negro, calling local artists from each participating city, with great adhesion and applause from the crowd and press.

Also in this year, they release the videos "Errar es Inhumano", and "Black Pato", both directed by Rodrigo Espina. In April 2011 the band open Dominic Miller’s show in Argentina.

During 2013 GP3F premiere its video trilogy directed by Rodrigo Espina, in advance of its upcoming album. During April they release "Alegría", in August "Luces de Cristal", and in November "Surferos del Alma (por el mar))." These videos are filmed in natural locations, including Tigre, Argentina's coast, and Brazilian beach Praia de Rosa. In the clip "Surferos" there is a great reference for Brazilian surf: Capitão David, with his Surf School.

In December 2013, after two years of production of the new material, GP3F release "Maravillas", its second studio album, where the band reinforces its original style of fusion with its own identity, edited by Geiser Records / Sony Music.

In February 2015, GP3F plays at festival Rock BA. In March of the same year, GP3F begins its first international tour, participating in festival South by Southwest (SXSW), which is joined by a promotional tour and concerts in Houston, Austin, Dallas, Miami and Los Angeles, in the USA.

During July 2015 they perform the prestigious musical show CM Vivo, at El Canal de la Música.

In October 2015, it undertakes a new tour by the United States and Mexico where its new song "Maravillas" is presented with the first bioclip of the band. The visit includes shows at the legendary Bulldog Cafe of CDMX,  Foro Independencia in Guadalajara, and The Mint in Los Angeles. On this occasion accompanies GP3F on its tour, the renowned Brazilian bass player and composer Arthur Maia, who from now on becomes a stable member of the band. At the same time, they film a new video "Una Flor de Lis", directed by the Mexican Luciana Herrera. In addition to providing seminars at the Universidad Libre de Música - ULM (Guadalajara), and the Musicians Institute of Hollywood.

During April 2016, GP3F makes its third international tour returning to Mexico, and adding Central America. They perform shows at the Bulldog Cafe (CDMX), in Guadalajara at The Urban, Tianguis Cultural, and Vía Recreactiva (presentations supported by the Universidad Libre de Música, and the Universidad de Guadalajara), and at Festival Brahva de San Marcos, Guatemala.

In June, in the city of Niterói, Rio de Janeiro, Brazil, GP3F recorded a new version of its theme "Bella Flor" with Brazilian musicians invited, offer a live show and record the video of the song, directed by the Brazilian Neon Maia.

In the month of October, in their fourth international tour, they are presented at the Feria Internacional del Libro de CDMX, Bulldog Cafe, Caradura, and Centro Cultural España, all of them in the CDMX. At the Cervantino Festival in Irapuato, at Palindromo in Guadalajara, and at the Culture Festival Zapopan, in the city of Zapopan.

In February 2017, GP3F performed at the Personal Fest in the city of Mar del Plata, Argentina.

In March 2017, G3PF starts its 5th. international tour, with invited Mexican musicians, performing shows in the cities of Mexico, Monterrey, Guadalajara, Zapopan, Toluca, Puebla, Irapuato, Leon, and Querétaro, among which are the presentations at the Bulldog Cafe, Centro Universitario Of Economic-Administrative Sciences (CUCEA), and in Vive Latino 2017

In July of the same year, they made a new presentation in Niteroi (Brazil), and recorded a one-hour special on the show Todas As Bossas, on TV Brasil, in Rio e Janeiro, along with Arthur Maia and invited Brazilian musicians.

In October GP3F returns to Brazil to play at the Feira Expomusic, in São Paulo, with Arthur Maia, Anel Paz, Renato Neto, Jorge Platero and Manny Monteiro, forming the band at these shows.

In November they perform again at the Personal Fest, this time at the Club Ciudad de Buenos Aires, and also give a seminar at the Escuela De Música Popular De Avellaneda (EMPA)

In February 2018 they made a new promotional tour of Mexico.

In March of the same year they released as a preview of the third album, a version of "Barro Tal Vez", of the song by Luis Alberto Spinetta.

In April they begin to record a new album at Arthur Maia's studio, in Niterói, and at Palco 41 Studio, in Rio de Janeiro.

In December 2018 Arthur Maia passes away, this early departure generates great sadness in the members of the band.

Months later GP3F decides to continue recording their third album.

In June Anel and Platero travel to Renato Neto's studio in São Paulo, where Renato records pianos and keyboards, and Michael Pipoquinha records the bass.

In August they released the single "Maracatu Chegando", and the video for this song, directed by Rodrigo Espina.

In October 2019 they perform at the Festival de la Cerveza de Guadalajara, with guest musicians from Mexico and Cuba.

In January 2020, GP3F releases the single and the video "Un Poco Perdido" directed by the Mexican Cuitlahuac Ruvalcaba Montero, filmed in Guadalajara City,

During 2020, due to the Covid-19 pandemic, GP3F must suspend its tour scheduled for March, and in the following months they participate in several online concerts.

In November 2020 they released their new single "Misteriosa Afinidad" with the participation of the musicians Renato Neto, Marcos Kinder, and Matías Méndez.

Currently GP3F is producing the video for "Misteriosa Afinidad", directed by Rodrigo Espina, while they continue recording their third studio album.

Official Videos 
a Marte(2008)

Carnavalero (2009)

Errar es Inhumano (2010)

Black Pato (2010)

Alegría (2013)

Luces de Cristal (2013)

Surferos del Alma (por el mar) (2013)

Maravillas (2015)

Una Flor de Lis (2015)

Bella Flor (2016)

Maracatu Chegando (2019)

Un Poco Perdido (2019)

Misteriosa Afinidad (2021)

Some shows performed by GP3F 
Opening act of Gilberto Gil at the Teatro Gran Rex 2008 (Argentina)

Pepsi Music 2008 (Argentina)

CM Vivo at the Canal de la Música 2009 (Argentina)

Pepsi Music 2009 (Argentina)

Primer Festival Itinerante de World Music 2010 (Argentina)

Opening act of Dominic Miller 2011(Argentina)

Pepsi Music 2011(Argentina)

Quilmes Rock 2013 (Argentina)

Rock BA 2015 (Argentina)

South by Southwest SXSW 2015 (USA)

Bulldog Cafe 2015-2016-2017(México)

CM Vivo at the Canal de la Música 2015 (Argentina)

Festival Brahva de San Marcos 2016 (Guatemala)

Festival Internacional Cervantino 2016 (México)

Feria del Libro 2016 (México)

Personal Fest 2017 (Argentina)

Vive Latino 2017 (México)

TV Brasil - Todas As Bossas (Brasil)

Feira Expomusic 2017 (Brasil)

Personal Fest 2017 (Argentina)

Festival de la Cerveza de Guadalajara - 2019 (México)

Players (Live and or Recording) 

Lead Vocal

Anel Paz - ( Argentina)

Arthur Maia - ( Brazil)

Jorge Platero - ( Uruguay)

Backing Vocal

Sonia Savinell - ( Argentina)

Alaíde Solórzano - ( México)

Natalia Velasco - ( México)

Dario Mariano Britos - ( Argentina)

Guitar

Anel Paz - ( Argentina)

Diego La Rosa - ( Argentina)

Josefina Anselmo - ( Argentina)

Ticao Freitas - ( Brazil)

Alex Ram - ( México)

Bass

Arthur Maia - ( Brazil)

Michael Pipoquinha - ( Brazil)

Kiki Ferreira - ( Brazil)

Matías Méndez ( Argentina)

Daniel Menezes - ( Brazil)

Xavier Orozco - ( México)

Drums

César La Rosa ( Argentina)

Marcos Kinder - ( Brazil)

Manny Monteiro - ( Brazil)

Emmanuel Cauvet - ( Argentina)

Nilton “Chocolate” Silva - ( Brazil)

Percussion

Jorge Macedo Platero - ( Uruguay)

Berg Campos - ( Brazil)

Keyboards

Renato Neto - ( Brazil)

Mayra Dómine - ( Argentina)

Claudinho Andrade - ( Brazil)

Tomás Hepner - (( Argentina)

Alba Rosa - ( México)

Trumpet

Miguel Hornes - ( Argentina)

Facundo Bainat - ( Argentina)

Fernando Padilla - ( Cuba)

Cristian Cáceres - ( Argentina)

Ervin Stutz - ( Argentina)

Alex Guardiola - ( Cuba)

Bruno Santos - ( Brazil)

Alan Varela - ( México)

Yves González Rodriguez - ( Cuba)

Sax

Mauricio De Ambrossi - ( Argentina)

Yamile Burich - ( Argentina)

Emmanuel Famin - ( Argentina)

Alejo von der Pahlen - ( Argentina)

Carlos Arin - ( Argentina)

Diego Franco - ( México)

Daniel Cordero - ( México)

Tino Junior - ( Brazil)

Eduardo Aguilar - ( México)

Trombone

Leandro “Loosi” Loos - ( Argentina)

Mauro “Vasco” Echeverría - ( Argentina)

Nathan Lane  - ( USA)

Luca Ferrelli - ( Argentina)

Reinier Toledo Sánchez - ( México)

Rafael Rocha - ( Brasil)

Edgar Andre Castañón - ( México)

Discography

References

External links 
 

Musical groups established in 2007
World music groups
Argentine musical groups